The Mahratta Hound, sometimes called the Mahratta Greyhound, is a breed of dog found in India. It is a sighthound, and like the Banjara Hound it is bred and used for hunting by the nomadic Banjara of Maharashtra. It is prized for its prowess in hunting panther and boar, both very formidable prey for a hound, as well as blackbuck.

See also
 Dogs portal
 List of dog breeds
 List of dog breeds from India

References 

Dog breeds originating in India
Dog landraces